

Pennsylvania state historical markers in Adams County by the Pennsylvania Historical and Museum Commission (PHMC) are 44 signs, including 16 regarding the Gettysburg Campaign.

Historical markers

See also

List of Pennsylvania state historical markers
National Register of Historic Places listings in Adams County, Pennsylvania

References

External links
Pennsylvania Historical Marker Program
Pennsylvania Historical & Museum Commission

.
Adams County
Adams County, Pennsylvania
.
Tourist attractions in Adams County, Pennsylvania